Terry Stanton Cornutt (born October 2, 1952) is former Major League Baseball pitcher who played for the San Francisco Giants in  and .

External links

1952 births
Living people
Baseball players from Oregon
San Francisco Giants players
Major League Baseball pitchers
Sportspeople from Roseburg, Oregon
Amarillo Giants players
Fresno Giants players
Great Falls Giants players
Lafayette Drillers players
Phoenix Giants players